When Mexico's congress changed the constitution in 1827 and 1835, and banned slavery in 1829 and immigration in 1830, immigrants, slave-owners, and federalists throughout the country revolted; in Texas, an armed uprising began on October 2, 1835, when settlers refused to return a small cannon to Mexican troops. This Battle of Gonzales ended with Mexican troops retreating empty-handed to San Antonio de Bexar (now the U.S. city of San Antonio, Texas). Emboldened by their victory, the Texans formed a volunteer army. The majority of the Texan troops followed General Sam Houston where they initiated a siege of the Mexican garrison. After victories in several skirmishes, including the Battle of Concepción and the Grass Fight, the Texans attacked Bexar. After several days of fighting, the Siege of Bexar ended with the surrender of the Mexican general.

Many Texans believed the war was now over, and the majority of the settlers returned to their homes.  The remaining settlers were garrisoned at the Alamo Mission in Bexar and at Presidio La Bahia in Goliad. In early January, a large number of the remaining settlers, most of whom were immigrants recently arrived from the United States, despite the immigration ban passed by Mexico in April, 1830, began clamoring to invade Mexico. Colonel Frank W. Johnson and Dr. James Grant began preparing to attack Matamoros. Even before Cos's defeat, Santa Anna had been making plans to retake Texas. In January, he led the "Army of Operations in Texas" towards the rebellious territory. At the Rio Grande, the army divided; Santa Anna led the bulk of his troops toward Bexar, where he laid siege to the Alamo.  The remaining troops, under General Jose de Urrea, traveled up the coastline, easily defeating Johnson and Grant at the battles of San Patricio and Agua Dulce.

News of these first Mexican victories cheered the Mexican force gathered at Bexar. On March 6, Santa Anna ordered an advance on the Alamo; all but a few of the occupants were killed. Susanna Dickinson, the wife of an Alamo occupier, her infant daughter, Angelina, and Joe, a slave of William Barret Travis, were released to tell Sam Houston what had happened. The youngest person in the Alamo was 16 years old. They were told to say that everyone would either surrender or die.

News of the Texan defeat and approach of the Mexican army terrified the settlers; in an event later known as the Runaway Scrape, settlers, the Texas government, and the remnants of the Texan army under the command of Sam Houston fled east, away from the approaching army. Houston ordered Colonel James Fannin to abandon Goliad and join his retreat. However, Fannin delayed his departure and sent a quarter of his troops to help evacuate the settlers at Refugio. Mexican forces in the area were stronger than the Texans expected at Refugio and defeated them. After receiving word of the defeat, Fannin finally began his retreat. His men were quickly overtaken and surrounded by Mexican soldiers. Fannin fought courageously at the Battle of Coleto, but was forced to surrender. He and his 300 men were taken prisoner, but just days later were executed in the Goliad Massacre.

The only remaining Texan troops were those retreating with Houston. After learning that Santa Anna had again divided his forces, Houston ordered an attack on April 21, 1836. Crying "Remember the Alamo" and "Remember Goliad", the Texans showed little mercy during the Battle of San Jacinto. Santa Anna was captured in hiding the following day and he ordered his army to return to Mexico, ending the Texas Revolution.

Key 
(M) – Mexican victory
(T) – Texan victory

See also
Timeline of the Texas Revolution
Tampico Expedition, a group organized in New Orleans who were told they would join the Texas Revolution. They actually attacked Tampico in Mexico before the survivors retreated to Texas.

Footnotes

Sources 

Texas Revolution battles

Texas Revolution battles